Serena Williams was the defending champion, and successfully defended her title, defeating Victoria Azarenka in the final, 6–4, 7–5. Williams became the first woman to defend her title at the event.

Seeds
The top two seeds receive a bye into the second round.

 Serena Williams (champion)
 Victoria Azarenka (final)
 Maria Sharapova (semifinals)
 Jelena Janković (semifinals)
 Angelique Kerber (quarterfinals)
 Caroline Wozniacki (withdrew because of a right shoulder injury)
 Sabine Lisicki (second round, withdrew because of a gastrointestinal illness)
 Carla Suárez Navarro (second round)
 Dominika Cibulková (quarterfinals)

Draw

Finals

Top half

Bottom half

Qualifying

Seeds

Qualifiers

Lucky loser
 ''' Hsieh Su-wei

Qualifying draw

First qualifier

Second qualifier

Third qualifier

Fourth qualifier

External links
 Main draw
 Qualifying draw

2014 WTA Tour
Women's Singles